Pavoraja arenaria, commonly known as the sandy skate or yellow skate, is a species of fish in the family Arhynchobatidae. It lives in depths ranging from 192 to 712 meters but is usually found at 300 to 400 meters depth off the coast of western Australia. Its maximum size is  total length. It is a little-known species that could be threatened by being taken as by-catch in trawl fisheries.

References

Pavoraja
Fish of the Indian Ocean
Taxa named by Peter R. Last
Taxa named by Stephen Mallick
Taxa named by Gordon K. Yearsley
Fish described in 2008